Michelle Denise Bernard (born July 30, 1963, Washington, D.C.) is an American journalist, political analyst, lawyer,  author, and President and CEO of the Bernard Center For Women, Politics & Public Policy.

Education
Bernard graduated from Howard University with a B.A. in philosophy and a minor in political science. She has a Juris Doctor degree from Georgetown University Law Center.

Early life and career
She was a partner at the lobbyist and law firm Patton Boggs. In 2000, she was a member of the Bush-Cheney Presidential Inaugural Committee. She was formerly President and CEO of Independent Women's Forum and Independent Women's Voice. She was the chair for the District of Columbia's Redevelopment Land Agency, which negotiated the public-private financing of the District's MCI Arena.

Bernard is frequently a political and legal analyst for MSNBC, Al Jazeera, CNN, NPR and The McLaughlin Group. She is a columnist for Roll Call; and also a contributor for 'The Seventy-Four',The Root, The Washington Post's "She the People," and the Huffington Post.

She is an Independent.

She is a member of the Board of Trustees of Hampton University and sits on the board of directors of the Coalition for Opportunity in Education and the Executive Board of the International Women's Forum of Washington, D.C. where she is the Leadership Foundation Liaison. Additionally, she is a member of the advisory board of the American Board for Certification of Teacher Excellence, and a speaker for the Washington Speaker's Bureau.

Her family heritage is Jamaican American, saying in an interview with Bill Steigerwald, "My parents are American citizens, but they come from Jamaica. I was raised with very American and Jamaican values. In our culture, we have a very strong sense of pride and of family honor and of self-reliance."

Awards
 Bernard was granted the 2016 Howard University Distinguished Alumni Achievement Award in the Fields of Media, Journalism and Public Policy.
 Bernard was named the Spring 2015 Mary Louise Smith Chair in Women and Politics by Iowa State University on March 23, 2015.
 She received the Anvil of Freedom Award for Journalism and Democracy from the University of Denver's Estlow International Center for Journalism & New Media on January 23, 2015.
 Also, she was named in the November 2014 of Essence Magazine as a Rising Star in their Money & Power list.

Personal life
Bernard was married to CNN correspondent Joe Johns until the couple divorced in 2008. Bernard remarried in 2014 and lives in Potomac, Maryland with her husband Keith Bell, as well as two children from her previous marriage. Keith Bell passed away in 2019.

Bibliography
 Bernard, Michelle D. (2013), Moving America Toward Justice: The Lawyers' Committee For Civil Rights Under Law, 1963-2013, The Donning Company Publishers. 
 Bernard, Michelle D. (2007), Women’s Progress: How Women Are Wealthier, Healthier, and More Independent Than Ever Before, Spence Pub.

References

External links
  Bernard Center for Women, Politics & Public Policy
 
 
 Michelle Bernard at The Huffington Post
 Article archive at Sojourners

1963 births
Living people
21st-century American journalists
21st-century American lawyers
21st-century American non-fiction writers
21st-century American women writers
African-American journalists
African-American lawyers
African-American television personalities
African-American women journalists
African-American women lawyers
African-American women writers
African-American writers
American columnists
American women columnists
American political commentators
American political journalists
American political writers
American writers of Jamaican descent
Georgetown University Law Center alumni
Howard University alumni
Journalists from Washington, D.C.
American opinion journalists
Washington, D.C., Independents
Washington, D.C., Republicans
21st-century American women lawyers
21st-century African-American women
21st-century African-American people
20th-century African-American people
20th-century African-American women